Jhol (earlier titled as Two+Two) is an unreleased Pakistani action comedy film directed and written by Shahid Shafaat, at his directorial debut, and co-produced by Hamza Ansari, Hassaan Azher under the production banner Epiction Films. The film stars an ensemble cast of Urwa Hocane, Zahid Ahmed, Ali Azmat and Saleem Mairaj. Babra Sharif has been hired to play Bilal Ashraf's mother in the film whereas Mustafa Qureshi who will play Ali Azmat's father. The film will be distributed by IMGC Global Entertainment.

Cast
 Zahid Ahmed
 Urwa Hocane
 Ali Azmat
 Nausheen Shah as Chandani
 Saleem Mairaj
 Shakeel Hussain Khan
 Mustafa Qureshi
 Babra Sharif

Production

Filming and casting
The film was shot in Karachi and Hyderabad as stated by producer "90% of our shoot is outdoors, and we're showing Karachi's culture in areas like Ranchore Lines and even parts of Hyderabad". The film had earlier cast Iman Ali in Urwa's role but producers reconsidered it soon. Most of the technical crew of film is from China and Singapore. The stunts are coordinated by the same person who handled Jet Lee's Hero. Nausheen Shah was cast to play the role of Ali Azmat's wife character Chandani.

References

External links

Urdu-language Pakistani films
Films shot in Karachi
Pakistani action comedy films
Films shot in Hyderabad, Sindh
Unreleased Pakistani films